Cock ale, popular in 17th and 18th-century England, was an ale whose recipe consisted of normal ale, to which was later added a bag stuffed with a parboiled, skinned and gutted cock, and various fruits and spices.

Recipe
The Oxford English Dictionary, which describes Cock ale as "ale mixed with the jelly or minced meat of a boiled cock, besides other ingredients", dates the drink's earliest mention to the mid 17th century, in Kenelm Digby's Closet Opened (published in 1669).  Included as a recipe, Digby's guide prescribes:

A similar recipe was printed in 1739 in The Compleat Housewife:

Thomas Fuller's Pharmacopœia extemporanea (1710) offers a recipe for Pectoral Ale (a cough medicine), which, with the addition of the afore-mentioned bird, parboiled, could apparently be turned into Cock ale.  Fuller explained that the drink "sweetens the Acrimony of the blood and humours, incites clammy phlegm, facilitates expectoration, invigorates the lungs, supplies soft nourishment, and is very profitable even in a consumption itself, if not too far gone."  The drink's supposed medicinal qualities were also advertised in John Nott's Cooks and Confectioner's Dictionary (1723), which claims that Cock ale is "good against a Consumption, and to restore a decay'd Nature."

Descriptions
A contemporary biographer claimed that King William III preferred Cock ale over wine.  The drink's entry in Robert Nares's Glossary describes it as "a sort of ale which was very celebrated in the seventeenth century for its superior quality".  Also included in that entry is a quote from Ned Ward's The London Spy, which calls Cock ale "a mixture of small-beer and treacle", although the author continues: "if this be cock-ale, said I, e'en let cocks-combs drink it."  Nathan Bailey's Dictionarium britannicum (1736) describes it as a "pleasant drink, said to be provocative", a sentiment mirrored by Francis Grose's Classical Dictionary of the Vulgar Tongue (1785), which also calls it provocative.  Writing in 1929, William Henry Nugent claimed that Cock ale was a concoction of bread and ale fed to fighting birds.

Several authors have theorised that Cock ale may have mutated into cocktail, an American word first recorded in 1803 whose origin is now lost.

References
Notes

Bibliography

External links
 Making a seventeenth century cock ale following Digby's recipe; tasting it

Types of beer
Beer in the United Kingdom